The Āniwaniwa Falls, or Rainbow Falls, are a two-drop waterfall located at northeastern Lake Waikaremoana in New Zealand.

See also
 Waterfalls of New Zealand

References

Waterfalls of New Zealand
Landforms of the Hawke's Bay Region